Boegel and Hine Flour Mill-Wommack Mill, also known as Grove Mill, is a historic grist mill complex located at Fair Grove, Greene County, Missouri. The mill was built in 1883, and is a 2 1/2-story, heavy timber frame building sided with vertical boards. Adjacent to the building are paired cylindrical grain storage silos of creek gravel concrete construction. The mill continued to operate until 1969.

It was listed on the National Register of Historic Places in 1986.

References

Grinding mills on the National Register of Historic Places in Missouri
Industrial buildings completed in 1883
Buildings and structures in Greene County, Missouri
National Register of Historic Places in Greene County, Missouri
1883 establishments in Missouri